The 1994 Gloucester City Council election took place on 5 May 1994 to elect members of Gloucester City Council in England.

Results  

|}

Ward results

Barnwood

Barton

Eastgate

Hucclecote

Kingsholm

Linden

Longlevens

Matson

Podsmead

Quedgeley

Tuffley

Westgate

References

1994 English local elections
1994
1990s in Gloucestershire